The  Futsal Klub Era-Pack Chrudim is a futsal club based in Chrudim, Czech Republic. The club was founded in 1991.

Current roster

Honours
Source:

12 League titles: 2004, 2005, 2007, 2008, 2009, 2010, 2011, 2012, 2013, 2014, 2015, 2016
8 Czech Cups: 2005, 2008, 2009, 2010, 2011, 2012, 2013, 2015

References

External links
 Official website

Futsal clubs established in 1991
Futsal clubs in the Czech Republic
Chrudim